Claude Marcelle Jorré, better known as Claude Jade (8 October 1948 – 1 December 2006), was a French actress. She starred as Christine in François Truffaut's three films Stolen Kisses (1968), Bed and Board (1970) and Love on the Run (1979). Jade acted in theatre, film and television. Her film work outside France included the Soviet Union, the United States, Italy, Belgium, Germany and Japan.

Early career
The daughter of university professors, Jade spent three years at Dijon's Conservatory of Dramatic Art. In 1964 she played on stage 40 times the part of Agnès in Molière's L'école des femmes. In 1966 she won the Prix de Comédie for Jean Giraudoux's stage play Ondine, performed at the Comédie Boulogne. She moved to Paris and became a student of Jean-Laurent Cochet at the Edouard VII theater, and began acting in television productions, including a leading role in TV series Les oiseaux rares.

Films with François Truffaut

While performing as Frida in Pirandello's Henri IV, in a production by Sacha Pitoëff at the Théâtre Moderne, Jade was discovered by New Wave film director François Truffaut.  He was "completely taken by her beauty, her manners, her kindness, and her joie de vivre", and cast her in the role of Christine Darbon in Stolen Kisses (Baisers volés, 1968). During the filming, Truffaut fell in love with her, and there was talk of marriage. Truffaut dubbed Claude Jade “French cinema’s little sweetheart” and the director and his muse were soon a couple in real life, although Truffaut changed his mind about marrying her the night before their wedding. 

American critic Pauline Kael wrote that Jade "seems a less ethereal, more practical Catherine Deneuve".  

Playing the same character at different stages of her life, Jade appeared in three Truffaut films: loved from a distance in Stolen Kisses; married and misled in Bed and Board (Domicile Conjugal, 1970); and divorced but still on good terms in Love on the Run (1979).

The late 1960s in film
Some months after Truffaut's Stolen Kisses Claude Jade starred in Alfred Hitchcock's Topaz (1969), as Michèle Picard, a secret agent's anxious daughter, married to a reporter (Michel Subor). Recommended to Hitchcock by Truffaut, she was 19 years old when cast, with Dany Robin playing her mother. Hitchcock said he chose the two actresses to provide glamor, and later quipped, "Claude Jade is a rather quiet young lady, but I wouldn't guarantee [that] about her behavior in a taxi". Jade recounted that they "talked in a Paris hotel about cooking, and I gave him my recipe for soufflé and told him I liked Strangers on a Train, and that was that." 

Hitchcock said she resembled his former star Grace Kelly, and in France she was a younger Danielle Darrieux. Some of her scenes were deleted and restored for the director's cut of Topaz in 1999. Topaz was Jade's only Hollywood film. Universal Pictures offered her a seven-year contract, which she turned down reportedly because she preferred to work in French.

Director Tony Richardson's film Nijinsky (a.k.a. The Dancer) (1970), based on a screenplay by Edward Albee, was canceled during pre-production by producer Harry Saltzman. It was to have starred Jade as Vaslav Nijinsky's wife, alongside Rudolf Nureyev as Nijinsky and Paul Scofield as his lover Sergei Diaghilev. 

She had a leading role as Linda in Sous le signe de Monte-Cristo (Under the Sign of Monte Cristo) by André Hunebelle, a modern version of Alexandre Dumas' novel. Here the 19 years young actress starred alongside French cinema's veterans like Pierre Brasseur and Michel Auclair. 

Jade starred in Édouard Molinaro's My Uncle Benjamin (Mon oncle Benjamin, 1969) alongside Jacques Brel. As Manette she refuses Brel's advances until he produces a marriage contract. At the End Manette realizes she prefers happiness to a marriage contract after all. 

Her career continued in Belgium, where she played a young English teacher who is fatally intrigued by a murderer (Gérard Barray) in the 1969 film The Witness. Her fiancé is this movie was played by Jean-Claude Dauphin, to whom she was engaged at this time. Also in 1969 she starred as Helena in a film adaptation of Shakespeare's A Midsummer Night's Dream by Jean-Christophe Averty, Le Songe d'une nuit d'été .

The 1970s in film and TV
In 1970 she reprised her part as Christine from Stolen Kisses in Truffaut's Bed and Board as a married woman. The Truffaut films influenced her type as lovingly gentle modern young woman in contemporary cinema, which she contrasted in ambivalent figures: Critic Vincent Canby praised her in work in Gérard Brach's The Boat on the Grass (Le bateau sur l'herbe, 1971), in which she starred as Eleonore, a young girl between two friends (Jean-Pierre Cassel, John McEnery). She starred in Hearth Fires (Les feux de la chandeleur, 1972) as Laura, a daughter who wants to reconcile her parents (Annie Girardot, Jean Rochefort) and who falls in love with her mother's best friend (Bernard Fresson). Alongside Robert Hossein she played the priest's love Françoise in Forbidden Priests (Prêtres interdits, 1973). In Home Sweet Home (1973), she played a hardened nurse who is changed by a love affair with a social worker (Jacques Perrin).

Jade played a dual role in The Choice, 1976). She starred in three Italian films: as a private investigator in Number One (1973), as Tiffany, the girlfriend of a private eye (Frederick Stafford, her father from Topaz) in La ragazza di via Condotti (1973), and as Maria Teresa, an unhappily married woman in Eriprando Visconti's A Spiral of Mist (Una spirale di nebbia, 1977). She played a nun in Kita No Misaki - Cap du Nord (1976), by Japanese director Kei Kumai. In the same year she starred as Penny Vanderwood in Thinking Robots, based on a horror novel by George Langelaan. Among other films of the 1970s were Malicious Pleasure (Le malin plaisir, 1975), Trop c'est trop (1975) and the romantic comedy The Pawn (Le Pion, 1978), in which she starred as a young widow who wins the heart of her son's teacher (Henri Guybet). One year later Claude Jade played the part of Christine Doinel for the third time in Truffaut's Love on the Run. 

In 1970 she starred as Orphan Françoise in mini-series Mauregard, directed by Truffaut's co-writer Claude de Givray. Other TV roles in the decade were Sheherazade (in Shéhérazade) and Louise de La Vallière (in Le chateau perdu), Lucile Desmoulins (in La passion de Camille et Lucile Desmoulins). She starred in such television movies as Mamie Rose, La Mandragore, Monsieur Seul, Fou comme François, Les anneaux de Bicêtre, Ulysse est revenu, and, in her biggest success of that decade, as heroine Veronique d'Hergemont in the 1979 series The Island of Thirty Coffins (L'île aux trente cercueils).

The 1980s in film and TV
In the 1980s Jade moved to Moscow for three years with her husband Bernard Coste, a French diplomat, and her son Pierre Coste (born in 1976). She starred in two Soviet films. In Teheran 43 (1981) she played the mysterious terrorist Françoise, with Alain Delon and an international cast. For Sergei Yutkevich's Lenin in Paris (1981), she played the French Bolshevik Inessa Armand, although without the rumored love affair with Vladimir Lenin.

Among her other film roles in the 1980s were the arrested philosophy prof in Schools Falling Apart (Le Bahut va craquer, 1981), the lawyer Valouin in A Captain's Honor (L'honneur d'un capitaine, 1982),  the Vicki Baum-heroine Evelyne Droste in Rendezvous in Paris (1982) and the mysterious Alice in René Féret's thriller The Man Who Wasn't There (L'homme qui n'était pas là, 1987). 

She also appeared in TV movies, such as the thriller La grotte aux loups (1980); the drama Nous ne l'avons pas assez aimée (1980); Treize (1981); a dual role in Lise et Laura (1982); A Girl in the Sunflowers (1984); the Italian miniseries Voglia di volare (1984); the French-Spanish-Canadian-German miniseries Le grand secret (1989) and in episode L'amie d'enfance of the series Commissaire Moulin.

The 1990s in TV and film
During the 1990s Jade worked mainly in television, such as the TV series La tête en l'air and Fleur bleue, as guest star in Une femme d'honneur (ep.Mémoire perdue), Inspecteur Moretti (ep. Un enfant au soleil), Julie Lescaut (ep. Rumeurs) and Navarro (ep. Sentiments mortels). TV movies included L'Éternité devant soi, Le bonheur des autres, Eugénie Grandet and Porté disparu. From 1998 to 2000 she was the lead actress in the series Tide of Life (Cap des Pins). Her last U.S. acting part was a guest appearance on The Hitchhiker: in the episode Windows she is Monique, who shoots her neighbor David Marshall Grant at the end. 

Jade's film roles in cinemas in 1990s included Gabrielle Martin, a mother betrayed by her husband, in Tableau d'honneur. This was followed by her performance as shy lesbian Caroline in Jean-Pierre Mocky's Bonsoir. In 1998, she played a governor's wife, Reine Schmaltz, who saves herself on a lifeboat in the historical movie The Raft of the Medusa (Le Radeau de la Méduse, 1998).

The 2000s in TV and short films
In her last decade, Jade's work included the TV movie Sans famille (2000); the series La Crim (episode "Le secret" in 2004), and Groupe Flag (episode "Vrai ou faux" in 2005). She also appeared in an episode of the short film series Drug Scenes (Scénarios sur la drogue, episode "La rampe", 2000); and in the short À San Remo (2004).

Theatrical work
Jade was a member of Jean Meyer's theatre company in Lyon, appearing in plays by Jean Giraudoux (Helena in The Trojan War Will Not Take Place, and Isabelle in Intermezzo); Henry de Montherlant (Port Royal); James Joyce (The Exiles); Racine (Britannicus); and Balzac (Le Faiseur). She took roles in plays by Vladimir Volkoff (The Interrogation); Catherine Decours (Regulus 93); Michel Vinaver (Dissident il va sans dire), Alfred de Musset (Lorenzaccio) and others. She worked onstage in Lyon, Nantes, Dijon and Paris.

Many plays were adapted for TV, such as her performances as Helena in Shakespeares Midsummer Night's Dream; her Sylvie in Marcel Aymés Les oiseaux de lune; her Colomba in Jules Romains's adaptation of Ben Johnson's Volpone; her Clarisse in Jacques Deval's Il y a longtemps que je t'aime; her title role in Jules Supervielle's Shéhérazade; and her Louise de La Vallière in Le château perdu. Her last stage role was as Célimène in Jacques Rampal's Celimene and the Cardinal.

Later life
Jade published her autobiography, Baisers envolés, in 2004.

Death
On 1 December 2006, Jade died of uveal melanoma which had metastasised to metastatic liver disease. She wore a prosthetic eye in her last stage performance, Celimene and the Cardinal, in August 2006.

Awards
Jade won an award in 1970 for "Révelation de la Nuit du cinéma", and in 1975 she received the Prix Orange at the Cannes Film Festival. Her contributions to French culture were recognised in 1998, when was named a knight in the Légion d'honneur. In 2000 she won the New Wave Award at Palm Beach International Film Festival for her "trend-setting role in the world cinema", followed in 2002 by the  Prix Reconnaissance des Cinéphiles in Puget-Théniers.

Legacy
In 2013 a street in Dijon was named after Claude Jade: Allée Claude Jade, 21000 Dijon.

Selected filmography

References

External links

Claude Jade at Films de France
Claude Jade at DvdToile 
Claude Jade orbituary in Variety

1948 births
2006 deaths
20th-century French actresses
21st-century French actresses
French autobiographers
French stage actresses
French film actresses
French television actresses
Burials at Père Lachaise Cemetery
Deaths from cancer in France
Chevaliers of the Légion d'honneur
Actors from Dijon
Women autobiographers
Deaths from uveal melanoma
Deaths from liver disease